Below is a list of national emblems and coats of arms used by Asian countries, territories and regions.

Sovereign states

States with limited recognition

Dependencies and other territories

See also
 Flags of Asia
 Armorial of sovereign states
 Armorial of Africa
 Armorial of North America
 Armorial of South America
 Armorial of Europe
 Armorial of Oceania

Asia
Asia
Asia-related lists
 
Asia